Tim Dahl is a professional electric and double bass player, vocalist, keyboardist and composer living in New York City.  He is best known as the bass player of the noise-rock band Child Abuse  and Lydia Lunch Retrovirus. He also writes and performs for the jazz ensemble Pulverize The Sound.

Dahl has toured extensively throughout North and South America, Europe, Australia, New Zealand and Japan.  He has performed with many notable musicians, composers and performers including Yusef Lateef, Archie Shepp, Eugene Chadbourne, Tatsuya Yoshida, Von Freeman, Stanley Jordan, Mary Halvorson, Malcolm Mooney, Marc Ribot, Brian Chase, Hamid Drake, Elliott Sharp, Weasel Walter, Marni Nixon, Peter Evans, Kevin Shea, Mick Barr,Lydia Lunch, Jan Terri, The Bureau of Atomic Tourism, Ava Mendoza, etc.

As a bass player he is notable for unique style and technical savviness. Clifford Allen of Tiny Mixtapes' wrote "Tim Dahl [...] approaches his well-worn axe with a battery of pedals and loops, combining determinate speed with murkier sonics to create a landscape not unlike a harsh, speed-freak variant on Hugh Hopper."

Dahl currently lives in Brooklyn and is an active member in the music scene. He is the co-host of the Lydian Spin podcast with Lydia Lunch.

Selected discography
American Liberty League
Going to Coney Island - CD (Dick Move Records, 2011)

BarrSheaDahl
BarrSheaDahl -  CD (UgEXPLODE Records, 2012)

Child Abuse
Imaginary Enemy - CD/LP Album (Skin Graft, 2019)
Trouble In Paradise - CD/LP Album (Skin Graft, 2014)
Hipster Puppies: New York - Compilation Cassette (Hipster Puppies, 2011)
Cut and Run - CD/LP Album (Lovepump United Records, 2010)
Child Abuse - CD/LP Album (Lovepump United Records, 2007)
Child Abuse/Zs - 7" Split Album (Zum, 2008)
Child Abuse/Miracle of Birth - CD Split Album (Lovepump United Records, 2006)
Zum Audio Vol III - CD Compilation (ZUM, 2006)

Lydia Lunch Retrovirus
Live in Zurich - CD (Widowspeak, 2016)
Urge to Kill - LP/CD (Widowspeak, 2015)

Pulverize The Sound
Sequel - CD (More Is More Records, 2018)
self titled - CD (Relative Pitch Records, 2014)

Weasel Walter Large Ensemble ft. Henry Kaiser
Igneity: After the Fall of Civilization - CD (2016)

Nandor Nevai
D'M'N, Ava Mendoza, Tim Dahl, Nándor Névai - D'M'N - 6xFile, MP3, Album (The PSYKOMANTEUM, 2017)
Nevai_Nonet-String Oktet in A - LP (2013)

GRID
Grid - CD/LP (NNA Tapes, 2017)

G.o.V.
studio recording ep - DVD (2015)

The Gate
Stench - CD/LP (Smeraldina-Rima, 2014)

Yusef Lateef
YAL's 10th Anniversary - A Tribute Concert for Yusef Lateef - CD (YAL Records, 2002)

Talibam!
Boogie in the Breeze - CD (ESP Disk' Ltd., 2009)

Jason Cady
Happiness is the Problem - CD (Lock Step records, 2013)

Matthew Welch
Blarvuster - CD (Tzadik Records, 2010)

Barker Trio
self titled - CD (phantom ear music, 2015)

Andrew Barker/Paul Dunmall/Tim Dahl
Luddite - CD (2014)

The Hub 
Light Fuse and Get Away - CD (The Hub Artist Group, 2005)
Live in Gugalander - CD (EMD Records, 2003)
Trucker - CD (Innova Records, 2002)
Accident - CD (The Hub Artist Group, 2001)
Vandalism - CD (The Hub Artist Group, 2000)

The Spinning Wheels Drive Band
100% Totally Free Ringtones - CD (Versus Trade, 2011)

References

External links

Tim Dahl biography on All About Jazz
Tim Dahl homepage

Living people
American jazz bass guitarists
American male bass guitarists
American rock bass guitarists
American experimental musicians
American jazz composers
American male jazz composers
1975 births